Saroj Khan (born Nirmala Nagpal; 22 November 1948 – 3 July 2020) was an Indian dance choreographer in Hindi cinema. She was born in Bombay State (present day Maharashtra), India. She was best known for the dance form mujra and the first woman choreographer in Bollywood. With a career spanning over forty years, she choreographed more than 3000 songs. She died on 3 July 2020 of a sudden cardiac arrest.

Early life and career
She was born Nirmala Nagpal. Her parents, Kishanchand Sadhu Singh and Noni Singh, migrated to India after partition of India. She started her career as a child artist at the age of three with the film Nazarana as baby Shyama, and was a background dancer in the late 1950s. She learnt dance while working under film choreographer B. Sohanlal, whom she married at the age of 13 while he was 43 years and was already married with 4 children which she did not know at the time of marriage. After having three children (including one that died as an infant), the couple separated; after their separation, she married businessman Sardar Roshan Khan in 1975 and changed her name after converting to Islam. The couple have one child together: a daughter, Sukaina khan, who is known to run a dance institute in Dubai. Later, she moved to choreography, first as an assistant choreographer and later getting her break as an independent choreographer, with Sadhana Shivdasani's Geeta Mera Naam (1974). However, she had to wait many years to receive acclaim, which came with her work with Sridevi; Hawa Hawai in Mr India (1987), Main Teri Dushman, Dushman Tu Mera in Nagina (1986) and Mere Haathon Mein in Chandni (1989), and later with Madhuri Dixit, starting with the hit "Ek Do Teen" in Tezaab (1988), Tamma Tamma Loge in Thanedaar (1990) and Dhak Dhak Karne Laga in Beta (1992). Thereafter, she went on to become one of the most successful Bollywood choreographers.

In 2014, Khan worked with Madhuri Dixit again in Gulaab Gang. She was on the advisory board of Rishihood University.

Television appearances
Saroj Khan appeared on a reality dance show as a member of the jury in 2005 Nach Baliye, which aired on STAR One along with two other judges. She also appeared in the second season of the same show. She has recently been a judge for the show Ustaadon Ka Ustaad, which is aired on Sony Entertainment Television (India). She appeared on the 2008 show Nachle Ve with Saroj Khan, which was aired on NDTV Imagine. She choreographed for this show. She appeared on Sony's Boogie Woogie (TV series) show from December 2008 as one of the judges, along with Javed Jaffrey, Naved Jaffrey and Ravi Behl. She was a judge on the third season of a popular show – Jhalak Dikhhla Jaa, which began on 27 February 2009 and was aired on Sony Entertainment Television (India) alongside former Nach Baliye judge Vaibhavi Merchant and actress Juhi Chawla.

She was judging the dance reality show Nachle Ve with Saroj Khan. She has hosted and completed Nachle Ve with Saroj Khan.

In 2012, The Saroj Khan Story, a documentary produced by PSBT and Films Division of India and directed by Nidhi Tuli was released.

She appeared in Taarak Mehta Ka Ooltah Chashmah as a judge in a dance competition.

She won three National Film Awards and eight Filmfare Awards, the most recognition of any choreographer.

Death 
Saroj Khan was admitted to Guru Nanak Hospital at Bandra, Mumbai on 17 June 2020, because of breathing difficulties, and died of cardiac arrest on 3 July 2020 at the age of 71.

Selected filmography

 Sanam Tujhko Music Video (2020)
 Kalank (2019)
 Manikarnika: The Queen of Jhansi (2019)
 Byomkesh Pawrbo (2016) Bengali Film
 Tanu Weds Manu Returns (2015)
 Gulaab Gang (2014)
 Kochadaiiyaan (Tamil) (2014)
 ABCD: Any Body Can Dance (2012)
 Rowdy Rathore (2012)
 Agent Vinod (2012)
 Khatta Meetha (2010)
 Life Partner (2009)
 Love Aaj Kal (2009)
 Delhi-6 (2009)
 Jab We Met (2007) (Won the National Film Award for Best Choreography)
 Namastey London (2007)
 Guru (2007) (Won the Filmfare Award for Best Choreography)
 Dhan Dhana Dhan Goal (2007)
 Saawariya (2007)
 Don - The Chase Begins Again (2006)
 Fanaa (2006)
 Mangal Pandey: The Rising (2005)
 Sringaram (2005) (Tamil) Won the National Film Award for Best Choreography
 Veer-Zaara (2004)
 Swades (2004)
 Kuch Naa Kaho (2004)
 Dhund: The Fog (2003)
 Saathiya (2002)
 Devdas (2002) Won the Filmfare Award for Best Choreography & National Film Award
 Lagaan: Once Upon a Time in India (2001) Won the Filmfare Award for Best Choreography
 Hum Ho Gaye Aapke (2001)
 Fiza (2000)
 Taal (1999)
 Hum Dil De Chuke Sanam (1999) Won the Filmfare Award for Best Choreography & American Choreography Award
 Soldier (1998)
 Vinashak - Destroyer (1998)
 Choodalani Vundi (1998) Telugu movie
 Aur Pyaar Ho Gaya (1997)
 Pardes (1997)
 Iruvar (1997) (Tamil)
 Khamoshi: The Musical (1996)
 Dilwale Dulhania Le Jayenge (1995)
 Raja (1995)
 Yaraana (1995)
 Mohra (1994)
 Anjaam (1994)
 Baazigar (1993)
 Tholi Muddhu (1993) (Telugu)
 Aaina (1993)
 Khalnayak (1993)
 Darr (1993)
 Beta (1992)
 Vishwatma (1992)
 Awaargi (1990)
 Thanedaar (1990)
 Sailaab (1990)
 Chandni (1989)
 Chaalbaaz (1989)
 Nigahen: Nagina Part II (1989)
 Tezaab (1988)
 Kizhakku Africavil Sheela (1987) Tamil movie
 Mr India (1987)
 Hifazat (1987)
 Nagina (1986)
 Hero (1983)
 Thai Veedu  (1983) Tamil movie
 Geeta Mera Naam (1974)

As writer

 Veeru Dada (1990)
 Khiladi (1992)
 Hum Hain Bemisaal (1994)
 Nazar Ke Samne (1995)
 Chhote Sarkar (1996)
 Dil Tera Diwana (1996)
 Daava (1997)
 Judge Mujrim (1997)
 Bhai Bhai (1997)
 Hote Hote Pyar Ho Gaya (1999)
 Benaam (1999)
 Khanjar (2003)

Awards and recognitions

Saroj Khan was the recipient of the most National Film Awards for Best Choreography with three wins.

Filmfare Best Choreography Award

Saroj Khan was the first recipient of the filmfare Best Choreography Award. Filmfare instituted this award after watching the excellent choreography and audience response to Khan's song "Ek Do Teen" from Tezaab. Saroj Khan went on to have a hat-trick at the Filmfare awards winning consistently for 3 years from 1989 to 1991. She also held the record for winning the most Filmfare Best Choreographer Awards, winning 8.
 2008 – Guru for the song "Barso Re"
 2003 – Devdas for the song "Dola Re Dola"
 2000 – Hum Dil De Chuke Sanam for the song "Nimbooda Nimbooda"
 1994 – Khalnayak for the song "Choli Ke Peeche"
 1993 – Beta for the song "Dhak Dhak Karne Laga"
 1991 – Sailaab for the song "Humko Aaj Kal Hai Intezaar"
 1990 – ChaalBaaz for the song "Na Jaane Kahan Se"
 1989 – Tezaab for the song "Ek Do Teen"

American Choreography Award
 2002: Outstanding Achievement in Feature Film: Lagaan: Once Upon a Time in India (2001)

Nandi Awards
 1998: Nandi Award for Best Choreographer: Choodalani Vundi

Zee Cine Award for Best Choreography
 2003 – Devdas for the song "Dola Re Dola"

Kalakar Awards
 2011: 19th Annual Kalakar Achiever Award for Outstanding Contribution in Dance Choreography

IIFA Awards
 2000 – IIFA Award for Best Choreography for the song "Nimbooda Nimbooda" from Hum Dil De Chuke Sanam
 2019 – IIFA Lifetime Achievement Award

The Saroj Khan Story is a 2012 Indian documentary film on Khan's life directed by Nidhi Tuli and produced by Public Service Broadcasting Trust.

Controversy 
In April 2018, Khan made statements defending the practice of casting couch, stating that the film industry provides people employment and "doesn't rape and abandon" them. Following an online backlash, she apologised for her comments.

See also
 Indian women in dance First Time in Anand,Gujarat India in Boogie Woogie 2015 as a judge, Show Organised by Line producer Ashvin Borad, Surat.

References

External links

 
 

1948 births
2020 deaths
20th-century Indian dancers
20th-century Indian women artists
21st-century Indian dancers
21st-century Indian women artists
Best Choreography National Film Award winners
Dancers from Maharashtra
Filmfare Awards winners
Indian choreographers
Indian female dancers
Indian film choreographers
Indian women choreographers
Sindhi people
Women artists from Maharashtra